LimeLife LLC. is an American privately held cosmetics company based in New York. Limelife is a division of Alcone, a company founded in 1952, which supplied Broadway theaters with professional makeup. 

In 2018, the podcast “The Dream” featured Limelife in its season-long exploration of the problematic practices often associated with businesses that use multi-level marketing as their primary mode of sales. A member of the podcast’s production team joined Limelife and reported on the company’s high wholesale prices, predatory recruitment practices, and lack of practical professional development for its sales team. The reporter’s findings suggested that the vast majority of LimeLife “beauty guides” spend more money than they make, as they’re encouraged to constantly “expand their kits” in order to offer demonstrations to potential customers.

History 
LimeLife was born from the cosmetics company Alcone. Alcone was founded in 1952 and supplied professional grade makeup to broadway shows. 

Alcone later branched into direct sales under the name “Limelight.” In 2018 they rebranded their multi-level-marketing company as “Limelife.”

References

External links 
Official website

Mass media companies of the United States
2005 establishments in California